Dawson Township may refer to:

Canada 
 Dawson, Ontario, in Rainy River District
 Dawson Township, Manitoulin District, Ontario

United States 
 Dawson Township, McLean County, Illinois
 Dawson Township, Greene County, Iowa

Township name disambiguation pages